CU Writer, also known as "Word Chula", is a word processor capable of Thai language processing. First released to the public domain in 1989, the application runs on IBM PC compatible machines with Hercules graphics card. Later versions can run wit VGA, EGA, EDA, and other graphic technology. CU Writer was one of the most popular word processors in Thailand, until Windows gets more adoption and DOS application faded away.

References

External links 
 CU Writer 1.41 source code
  CU-Writer original homepage at Wayback Machine

DOS word processors
Free software
Thai-language computing
1989 software